Philip Stone (14 April 1924 – 15 June 2003) was an English actor, well known for portraying film characters such as "Pa", the father of Alex DeLarge, in A Clockwork Orange; General Alfred Jodl in Hitler: The Last Ten Days; Delbert Grady in The Shining; and Captain Phillip Blumburtt in Indiana Jones and the Temple of Doom. Stone's final film role was as the Bishop in The Baby of Mâcon.

In television, Stone is known for his roles as Detective-Sergeant Sowman in Coronation Street, Brigadier Davidson in The Rat Catchers and Sir John Gallagher in Justice.

Early life
Philip Stone (né Stones) was born in Kirkstall, Leeds. Stone was the youngest of four children and his father was a secondary school headmaster.

Career
He was the only actor to appear in three consecutive Stanley Kubrick films. First, he played the central character Alex's "P" (as in "M" and "P" for "Ma" and "Pa") in A Clockwork Orange (1971). Subsequently, he played Graham, the Lyndon family lawyer, in Barry Lyndon (1975), and Delbert Grady, the Butler who murdered his family in The Shining (1980). Stone was discovered when Kubrick saw him perform in David Storey's stage play, The Contractor. The only other actor to be credited in three Kubrick films is Joe Turkel.

Other film roles included parts in Thunderball, Where Eagles Dare, Quest for Love, Flash Gordon and Indiana Jones and the Temple of Doom. In the 1978 Ralph Bakshi's animated film The Lord of the Rings, he voiced the role of Théoden.

Stone also appeared in many popular TV series, including the first two episodes of Avengers (one of only two guest actors—the other being Warren Mitchell—to have played the same role twice in the series) Justice, Dalziel and Pascoe, A Touch of Frost, Heartbeat, Yes Minister, Bergerac and Coronation Street.

Personal life
Stone was married to Margaret Pickford until her death in 1984.

Death
Stone died in Ealing, London in 2003, aged 79.

Filmography

Film

Television

References

External links

1924 births
2003 deaths
English male film actors
English male stage actors
English male television actors
English male voice actors
Male actors from Leeds